A triple concerto (Italian: Concerto triplo, German: Tripelkonzert) is a concerto with three soloists. Such concertos have been composed from the Baroque period, including works by Corelli, Vivaldi, Bach and Telemann, to the 21st century, such as two works by Dmitri Smirnov. The most famous example is Beethoven's Triple Concerto for violin, cello and piano. His combination of solo instruments, a piano trio, was often used also in later works.

History

Many works in the genre concerto grosso were composed for three solo instruments, including Corelli's concerti grossi, Op. 6, for a trio (concertino) of two violins and cello. 1714. Antonio Vivaldi wrote several concertos for the same combination of instruments, published for example in L'estro armonico in 1711. Based on Italian models, Johann Sebastian Bach composed concertos for multiple instruments, including his Fourth Brandenburg Concerto, BWV 1049, with solo parts for violin and two recorders, his Fifth Brandenburg Concerto, BWV 1050, featuring violin, flute and harpsichord, the Concerto, BWV 1044, for the same soloists, and two concertos for three harpsichords and string orchestra.

Georg Philipp Telemann wrote 17 concertos for three instruments, many of them for two identical woodwind instruments, such as flutes or oboes, with a different third instrument such as violin or bassoon, others for three identical instruments, such as three violins, and for three different instruments, such as flute, violin and cello, published for example in his  collection.

Baroque Era

Arcangelo Corelli's twelve concerti grossi, Op. 6, each of them for a soloist group (concertino) consisting of two violins and cello, were published posthumously in 1714. After that publication, the concerto grosso qualification was used to indicate various types of baroque concertos with multiple soloists. Antonio Vivaldi's L'estro armonico, published in 1711, also contained a number of concertos for two violins and cello, however without concertos for multiple soloists being indicated as concerto grosso in this earlier publication. The difference in Corelli's and Vivaldi's approach towards concertos for multiple soloists, as well in style as regarding the name that was used for them, has been explained as relating to differences in music traditions in Rome (where Corelli lived) and Venice (where Vivaldi lived). This did not prevent that later music historians would often, retro-actively, describe Vivaldi's concertos for multiple instruments as concerti grossi. Whatever the naming and style differences, both Corelli and Vivaldi set two violins and a cello as the standard group of soloists for triple concertos of the first quarter of the 18th century.

Johann Sebastian Bach knew Italian concertos primarily through the Venetian composers, and thus also did not use the concerto grosso qualifier for his concertos for multiple soloists. Nonetheless also his concertos for multiple instruments were retro-actively called concerti grossi. Philipp Spitta, Bach's 19th-century biographer, qualified these extant concertos for three soloists as concerti grossi:
 Fifth Brandenburg Concerto, BWV 1050 (solo parts for violin, flute, harpsichord).
 Fourth Brandenburg Concerto, BWV 1049 (solo parts for violin and two recorders).
 Harpsichord concerto BWV 1057, arranged after BWV 1049, with the solo violin part replaced by harpsichord.
 Triple Concerto, BWV 1044, for the same soloists as the fifth Brandenburg Concerto.
 Two concertos for three harpsichords and string orchestra:
 No. 1 in D minor (BWV 1063), and,
 No. 2 in C major (BWV 1064).

Most of these concertos are for two identical woodwind instruments, such as flutes or oboes, with a different third instrument such as violin or bassoon. Telemann also wrote triple concertos for three identical instruments and for three different instruments: for instance, his  collections contain a concerto for three violins (TWV 53:F1), and one for flute, violin and cello (TWV 53:A2).

Classical and early Romantic Eras
The most popular triple concerto, commonly called Triple Concerto (Tripelkonzert), is Beethoven's Triple Concerto for violin, cello and piano.

Later developments

Triple concerto compositions

Examples of triple concertos include Johann Sebastian Bach's Triple Concerto, BWV 1044, with solo parts for violin, flute and harpsichord, Wolfgang Amadeus Mozart's Concerto No. 7 for three pianos, Ludwig van Beethoven's Triple Concerto for violin, cello and piano, and Dmitri Smirnov's Triple Concerto No. 2 for violin, harp and double bass.

In the following table, the compositions are initially sorted by a year of composition or publication, followed by composer, title, the three instruments, the kind of orchestra, and notes, such as a link to a reference.

Reception

References

Sources